Toshiko Akiyoshi Trio, 1980 In Rikuzentakata is a live concert album of the Toshiko Akiyoshi trio recorded in June, 1980 in the Shimin Kaikan Dai Hall in Rikuzentakata, Iwate, Japan.

Track listing
"Long Yellow Road" – 10:34 
"Old Devil Moon" (Lane, Harburg) – 8:55 
emcee speaks – 3:08 
"I Let a Song Go Out of My Heart" (Ellington) – 6:49
"Two Bass Hit" (Gillespie, Lewis) – 7:33 
"My Elegy" – 7:56 
"Autumn Sea" – 12:08 
"Notorious Tourist From The East" – 8:58  
emcee speaks – 4:21
"Tempus Fugit" (Powell) – 6:30 

all songs composed by Akiyoshi except as noted

Personnel
Toshiko Akiyoshi – piano 
Bob Bowman – bass 
Joey Baron – drums

References

jazzdisco.org
amazon.co.jp

Toshiko Akiyoshi albums